The Crimean Submediterranean forest complex is an ecoregion on the Black Sea coast of Russia and Ukraine. It is in the temperate broadleaf and mixed forests biome.

Geography
The ecoregion consists of two  coastal enclaves on northern coast of the Black Sea; one occupies the central coast of Crimea, extending into the Crimean Mountains, the other occupies the Black Sea coast of Krasnodar Krai, extending inland and eastward along the northwest flank of the Caucasus.

Climate
The ecoregion's climate and vegetation resemble that of the Mediterranean Basin, with a hot dry summer and a mild, rainy winter. Submediterranean forests occur at the transition between Mediterranean climate regions and temperate regions with colder winters.

Flora
At elevations below 400 meters, woodlands and maquis shrublands predominate with: 
oak,
Stone pine (Pinus pinea),
Aleppo pine (Pinus halepensis)
Christ's thorn (Paliurus spina-christi),
Mastic tree (Pistacia lentiscus),
Pyracantha,
sclerophyll shrubs

Between 400 and 800 meters are forests predominate with:
Pitsundian pine (Pinus brutia),
Downy oak (Quercus pubescens),
Oriental hornbeam (Carpinus orientalis),
European ash (Fraxinus excelsior).

From 800 to 1300 meters elevation forests predominate with: 
Scots pine (Pinus sylvestris)
Oriental beech (Fagus orientalis),
juniper woodlands

Culture
The region's warm summers and mild winters make it a popular resort destination. Cities and towns in the ecoregion include Yalta, Alupka, Alushta, Sevastopol, and Novorossiysk. The region's mild winters support vineyards and fruit orchards.

Protected areas
3,144 km², or 10%, of the ecoregion is in protected areas. Another 56% is forested but unprotected.

References

External links
 
 

Biota of the Black Sea
Biota of Crimea
Biota of Russia
Black Sea
Ecoregions of Europe
Ecoregions of Russia
Ecoregions of Ukraine
Flora of the Crimean Peninsula
Flora of Russia
Flora of Ukraine
Forests of Ukraine
Palearctic ecoregions
Temperate broadleaf and mixed forests